Events from the year 1710 in Scotland.

Incumbents 
 Secretary of State for Scotland: The Duke of Queensberry

Law officers 
 Lord Advocate – Sir David Dalrymple, 1st Baronet
 Solicitor General for Scotland – Thomas Kennedy jointly with Sir James Steuart, Bt.

Judiciary 
 Lord President of the Court of Session – Lord North Berwick
 Lord Justice General – Lord Tarbat until 23 October; then Lord Ilay
 Lord Justice Clerk – Lord Ormiston, then Lord Grange

Events 
Dry stone dykes (i.e. walls) built in Galloway to enclose land on a large scale.
Dancing 'assemblies' in Edinburgh begin.

Births 
 15 April – William Cullen, physician, chemist and agriculturalist (died 1790)
 25 April – James Ferguson, astronomer, instrument and globe maker (died 1776)

Deaths 
 1 January – William Bruce, architect (born 1630)
 1 June – David Mitchell, admiral (born 1642)
 20 September – John Carmichael, 1st Earl of Hyndford, nobleman and politician (born 1638)
 10 December – Robert Mylne, the last Master Mason to the Crown of Scotland (born 1633)

See also 
 1710 in Great Britain

References 

 
Years of the 18th century in Scotland
1700s in Scotland